The Billboard Top Latin albums chart, published in Billboard magazine, is a record chart that features Latin music sales information. These data are compiled by Nielsen SoundScan from a sample that includes music stores, music departments at electronics and department stores, Internet sales (both physical and digital) and verifiable sales from concert venues in the United States.

There were twenty-two number-one albums in 2004, including two releases by the Mexican group Los Temerarios: Tributo al Amor and Veintisiete; the latter album received a nomination for a Grammy Award for Best Mexican/Mexican-American Album. However, the award went to Intimamente by Intocable, which also peaked at number one on the chart in March. Mi Sangre, by Colombian performer Juanes, was nominated for a Grammy Award for Best Latin Rock/Alternative Album, won three Latin Grammy Awards, and also reached the top spot of this chart for five consecutive weeks from October 16 to November 13, 2004.

Singer-songwriter Marco Antonio Solís also peaked twice at the top of the chart with his greatest hits album La Historia Continúa... and his Latin Grammy Award nominated album Razón de Sobra. Daddy Yankee, Jennifer Peña, Grupo Climax and Adán Sánchez peaked at number one for the first time in 2004. Luis Miguel's México En La Piel became his sixth number-one set on the chart and was also the winner of a Latin Grammy Award for Best Ranchero Album and the Grammy Award for Best Mexican/Mexican-American Album in 2005.

Two albums by Marc Anthony reached the top spot of the chart: Amar Sin Mentiras and Valió La Pena. With these recordings, Marc Anthony won the Grammy Award for Best Latin Pop Album and was nominated for a Latin Grammy Award for Best Male Pop Vocal Album for Amar Sin Mentiras. Valió La Pena was awarded with the Latin Grammy Award for Best Salsa Album and also received a Grammy Award nomination for Best Salsa/Merengue album.

Albums

References

2004 Latin
United States Latin Albums
2004 in Latin music